Onbaşılar can refer to:

 Onbaşılar, Alaca
 Onbaşılar, Silvan